Urgedra chlorolepis is a moth of the family Notodontidae. It is found in north-eastern Ecuador.

The length of the forewings is 15–18.5 mm. The ground colour of the forewings is an uneven mixture of dark, glossy brown and light brown scales. There are irregular patches of glossy, yellowish green scales behind the costa. The ground colour of the hindwings is dirty grey-brown.

Etymology
The species name is derived from Greek chloros (meaning green) and lepis (meaning scale) and refers to the sprinkling of vibrant green scales near the forewing base.

References

Moths described in 2011
Notodontidae